Clifford Andre is a member of the National Assembly of Seychelles.  A lawyer and marine captain by profession, he is a member of the Seychelles People's Progressive Front, and was first elected to the Assembly in 2007.

References
Member page on Assembly website

Year of birth missing (living people)
Living people
Members of the National Assembly (Seychelles)
Seychellois sailors
Seychellois lawyers
United Seychelles Party politicians